The Brotherhood is a 2017 Indian documentary film, based on much talked Dadri mob lynching incident in Greater Noida Uttar Pradesh. Senior journalist Pankaj Parashar is the director and producer of the documentary. The Brotherhood is attempt to promote cultural harmony in the region. The documentary received an overwhelming response from the audience.

Concept and story 
The Brotherhood begins with indication towards 2015’s Dadri lynching case and moves on to prove how this individual event doesn’t really portrays reality of the region. History of Bhati tribe to formation of Bhati Muslims, the documentary enlightens the viewers with multiple facades of this western UP region. Film brings forth the legacy in the beautiful time travel depicted through annals of history of Bhati Hindus and Bhati Muslims. The village Ghodi Bachheda from Greater Noida and Til Beghampur from Bulandshahr are at the center. The Hindu residents of Ghodi Bachheda treats the Muslim residents of Til Beghampur as elder brothers. Ghodi Bacchheda and Til Begumpur, the warps and wefts of Bhagwa vastra and Taqiyya weave a beautiful symphony.

Historical connections 

No Muslim family left Bhatner to go to Pakistan during the partition of India because the elders convinced them of peaceful co-existence. During the revolt of 1857 both Hindu and Muslim Bhatis fought with Britishers and sacrificed together. An example of recent days filmed in documentary related with 2017 Uttar Pradesh Legislative Assembly election. It was noticed that Hindu and Muslim voters were divided. But Hindu and the Muslim Bhatis combined together. Owing to this, for the first time after freedom, a Bhati Thakur candidate Dhirendra Singh has been elected from Jewar (Assembly constituency) seat. These voters, instead of being divided on the basis of Hindu and Muslim, voted comprehensively without being swayed. The effort is to bring the community together to voice their feelings unabashedly, and make the region a glaring example of progressive and culturally inclusive governance.

Trailer of the documentary 
Trailer of the documentary has been released on 16 May 2017 on YouTube. A technical preview of documentary was held at Birla Institute of Management Technology Greater Noida on 24 April 2017. Viewers are appreciating the message. Documentary is under certification process before Central Board of Film Certification of India.

Controversy with CBFC 
Central Board of Film Certification India (CBFC) had many objections on the documentary film. The Board had given order to cut three scenes from the film. Even after this the Board wanted to give U/A certificate. While Pankaj Parashar was demanding V/U certificate. He appealed the CBFC order before Film Censor Appellate Tribunal (FCAT). The Chairman of the Tribunal, Justice Manmohan Sarin, members Shazia Ilmi and Poonam Dhillon saw the film during the hearing. After watching the film, the tribunal passed a unanimous order. The tribunal said, "This documentary film is a commendable effort to communal harmony in the country and especially the message of unity among the largest Hindu and Muslim communities." FCAT ordered to CBFC to certify the film with V/U category.

Release and broadcast 
Documentary film has been released on YouTube and other social media platforms on 15 August 2018, the occasion of Indian Independence day. Its special previews were aired on DTH service Tata Sky.

References 

Indian documentary films
2017 films